Discocainia is a genus of fungi within the Rhytismataceae family. The genus contains three species.

References

External links
Discocainia at Index Fungorum

Leotiomycetes